Perpis-Fall Music, Inc. or Perpis-Fall Music (pur-puhs fawl) is a pseudonym and production credit for the musical partnership of:
Gil Scott-Heron, a soul poet/musician and hip hop pioneer, and
Brian Jackson, a keyboardist and neo soul pioneer

See also
Winter in America

References

External links 
 Perpis-Fall Music, Inc. at Discogs

Gil Scott-Heron
Songwriting teams
Rock music duos